This is the complete list of women's Olympic medalists in kayaking.

Current program

Slalom

C-1

K-1

Kayak cross

Sprint

C-1 200 metres

C-2 500 metres

K-1 500 metres

K-2 500 metres

K-4 500 metres

Discontinued event

K-1 200 metres

References
 International Olympic Committee results database

Canoeing (women)
medalists
Canoeing

Olympic